Beyond the Walls is a 2012 French / Belgian / Canadian drama film directed by David Lambert.

Cast 
 Guillaume Gouix as Ilir
 Matila Malliarakis as Paulo
 David Salles as Grégoire
 Mélissa Désormeaux-Poulin as Anka
 Flonja Kodheli as Ilir's sister
  as La mère d'Ilir

References

External links 
 

2012 drama films
Belgian drama films
French drama films
Gay-related films
LGBT-related drama films
2012 LGBT-related films
2012 films
2010s French-language films
French-language Belgian films
French-language Canadian films
Canadian drama films
Belgian LGBT-related films
Canadian LGBT-related films
French LGBT-related films
2010s Canadian films
2010s French films